Andrew Dales (born 13 November 1994) is an English professional footballer who plays for Mickleover as a winger.

Club career
Born in Derby, Dales spent 10 years with the youth team of Derby County after joining at the age of 9. He was offered a professional contract by Derby in 2013.

He then played non-League football with Mickleover Sports, and trained with the V9 Academy, before signing for Scunthorpe United in June 2018. He scored on his professional debut on 4 August 2018.

Dales was loaned to Scottish Premiership club Dundee in January 2019. He moved on loan to Hamilton Academical in January 2020.

In November 2020 he moved on loan to Altrincham. He was one of 17 players released by Scunthorpe at the end of the 2020–21 season.

He returned to Mickleover ahead of the 2021–22 season.

International career
Dales was an England C international.

Career statistics

References

1994 births
Living people
English footballers
Derby County F.C. players
Mickleover Sports F.C. players
V9 Academy players
Scunthorpe United F.C. players
Dundee F.C. players
Hamilton Academical F.C. players
Altrincham F.C. players
English Football League players
Scottish Professional Football League players
National League (English football) players
Association football wingers